Las Casas commonly referred to as Bartolomé de las Casas (1484–1566), Spanish historian, social reformer and Dominican friar.

Las Casas may also refer to:

People
 Alberto de las Casas (died 1544), Catholic church figure
 Arán de las Casas (born 1989), Venezuelan actor and singer
 Dianne de Las Casas (1970–2017), Philippine-born American author and storyteller
 Francisco de las Casas (1461–1536), 16th-century Spanish conquistador
 José de Urrutia y de las Casas (1739–1803), Spanish captain general and military engineer
 Juan Bautista de las Casas (d. 1811), 18th-century Tejano revolutionary
 Julio Jesús de las Casas (born 1945), Venezuelan sports shooter
 Luis de Las Casas (1745–1800), Spanish Governor of Cuba
 Luis Felipe de Las Casas Grieve (1916–1988), Peruvian politician and engineer
 Mario de las Casas (1905–2002), Peruvian footballer

Fictional characters
 Yunior de Las Casas, the subject of two short story collections by author Junot Diaz

Places
Chile
 Padre Las Casas, Chile, a city and commune located in Cautín Province
Dominican Republic
 Padre Las Casas, Dominican Republic, a municipality of the Azua province
Guatemala
 Fray Bartolomé de las Casas, a municipality in the department of Alta Verapaz
Mexico
 San Cristóbal de las Casas, a town and municipality located in the state of Chiapas
 San Cristóbal de las Casas National Airport
Philippines
 Las Casas Filipinas de Acuzar, a beach resort and heritage destination in Bagac, Bataan
Puerto Rico
 Las Casas (Santurce), a sector of Santurce, San Juan
 Camp Las Casas, a military installation established in Santurce in 1904
 Residencial Las Casas, a public housing project in San Juan
Spain
 Las Casas del Conde, a village and municipality in the province of Salamanca
United States
 Las Casas or Lascassas, Tennessee, an unincorporated community in Rutherford County
 Las Casas Occupational High School, a high school in Chicago, Illinois

See also
 Casas (disambiguation)